Stadtrandsiedlung is a German word meaning "suburban settlement". It may refer to several places in Germany:

 Stadtrandsiedlung, a quarter in downtown Greifswald
 Stadtrandsiedlung (Am Stadtrand), a neighbourhood in Potsdam
 Stadtrandsiedlung Blankenfelde, a neighbourhood in Blankenfelde, in the Berliner borough of Pankow
 Stadtrandsiedlung Buch, a neighbourhood in Karow, in the Berliner borough of Pankow
 Stadtrandsiedlung Malchow, a locality in the Berliner borough of Pankow

See also
Siedlung (disambiguation)